Vijay Kumar Chaturvedi is an Indian mechanical engineer and a nuclear power expert. He is a former Chairman and Managing Director of the Nuclear Power Corporation of India Limited (NPCIL). He did his graduate studies in mechanical engineering at Vikram University- Samrat Ashok Technological Institute in 1965 and secured a master's degree in nuclear engineering from Bhabha Atomic Research Centre Training School, Trombay.

After superannuating from NPCIL, Chaturvedi joined the Reliance Industries, served in such various capacities as that of a Director of New Power of Reliance Energy Limited, a Non-Executive of Reliance Power Limited, Director of the New Power at Reliance Infrastructure Limited and as a Non-Executive Director of Reliance Infrastructure Limited and serves the company as a member of its various committees.

Chaturvedi is a former member of the Atomic Energy Commission of India and has chaired the Tokyo Centre of the World Association of Nuclear Operators (WANO). He has also been a member of the Board of Governors of WANO for two years. The Government of India awarded him the fourth highest civilian honour of the Padma Shri in 2001.

See also 

 Atomic Energy Commission of India
 World Association of Nuclear Operators

References 

Recipients of the Padma Shri in science & engineering
Indian mechanical engineers
Indian corporate directors
Indian nuclear physicists
Vikram University alumni
Year of birth missing (living people)
Living people
20th-century Indian engineers